Auratonota nugax is a species of moth of the family Tortricidae. It is found in Ecuador.

The wingspan is about 11 mm. The costal half of the forewings is yellowish and the dorsal half is more creamy. The hindwings are pale brownish cream, but more fuscous apically.

References

Moths described in 2000
Auratonota
Moths of South America